Wu Kai Sha is the northeastern terminal station on the  of the Mass Transit Railway (MTR) system in Hong Kong. It was originally named "Lee On station" when the Ma On Shan line was under construction, for its proximity to the Lee On Estate on its southwest.

History 
On 21 December 2004, Wu Kai Sha station opened to the public with other KCR Ma On Shan Rail stations.

On 14 February 2020, the Ma On Shan line was extended south to the newly opened , as part of the first phase of the Shatin to Central Link project. The Ma On Shan line was renamed Tuen Ma line Phase 1 at the time. Wu Kai Sha station remained the northeastern terminus of the renamed line. 

Wu Kai Sha has since been the northeastern terminus of the Tuen Ma line.

Station layout

Entrances/Exits

 A1: Double Cove 
 A2: Double Cove
 B: Lake Silver 

Exit A is connected to a bridge over Sai Sha Road, and serves the Double Cove housing estate, Li Po Chun United World College, and the Wu Kai Sha village. Exit B serves the bus terminus next to the station, as well as the private housing estates of Monte Vista and Lake Silver, and is within walking distance to the housing estates of Lee On Estate and Kam Lung Court, as well as the Ma On Shan Ling Liang Primary School.

See also
 Ma On Shan
 Monte Vista
 Lake Silver

References

External links
 

MTR stations in the New Territories
Ma On Shan line
Tuen Ma line
Wu Kai Sha
Former Kowloon–Canton Railway stations
Railway stations in Hong Kong opened in 2004